Sökmen el-Kutbî (also spelled al-Qutbi) was a Turkmen military commander, a former slave amir in the service of the Seljuks, who became the founder of the Shah-i Arman dynasty, also known as the Shah-Armens or Ahlatshahs.

Early life
He was a subordinate and ghilman (slave commander) of  Seljukid prince Kutbüddin İsmâil İlarslan (a cousin of Malik-Shah I). After his superior was killed in a battle, upon the request of the citizens,  he moved to Ahlat (now a district center in Bitlis Province of Turkey, then an important Islamic cultural center) where he fought against Marwanids and captured the city on behalf of the Great Seljuk Empire in 1100.

Beylik

Sökmen captured the nearby settlements to the north and west of the Lake Van and increased his power of influence. His most successful conquest is the conquest of Silvan (now a district center in Diyarbakır Province of Turkey, then known as Mayyafaraqin).  But he was always loyal to the Seljukid sultan Mohammad I Tapar and participated in the campaigns of the sultan. Mohammad in turn granted Ahlat to Sökmen as an ikta in 1110. Thus this date is now considered to be the date of the establishment of Ahlatshahs Beylik. In some documents the name of the beylik is "Sökmenli" referring to Sökmen.

Death
In 1111, he was invited to participate in a Seljukid campaign. With his troops he joined the main Seljukid army.  But during the siege of Turbessel (a castle near Gaziantep) he died in August 1111. His coffin was sent to Ahlat.

References

Sources
 

Turkic rulers
1111 deaths
11th-century births
History of Bitlis Province
Generals of the Seljuk Empire
11th-century Turkic people
Ethnic Turkmen people